South-Western Career Academy is a facility in which students of the four high schools in the South-Western City Schools district can choose to attend, starting in their Junior year.

Affiliated schools
 Central Crossing High School
 Franklin Heights High School
 Grove City High School
 Westland High School

External links
 Career Tech website
 School website
 District website

High schools in Franklin County, Ohio
Public high schools in Ohio